The Goya Award for Best Adapted Screenplay (Spanish Premio Goya al mejor guión adaptado) is one of the Goya Awards, Spain's principal national film awards.

For the first two editions of the Goya Awards, only one award for screenplays was presented which included both original and adapted screenplays, with both winners being adaptations, Voyage to Nowhere in 1986 (based on the novel of the same name by Fernando Fernán Gómez) and El Bosque animado (based on the eponymous novel by Wenceslao Fernández Flórez) in 1987. Since the third edition, two awards are presented separately, Best Original Screenplay and Best Adapted Screenplay.

Rafael Azcona has received this award four times, more than any other nominee, winning for ¡Ay Carmela! (1990) with Carlos Saura, Banderas, the Tyrant (1993) with José Luis García Sánchez, Butterfly's Tongue (1999) with Manuel Rivas and José Luis Cuerda and The Blind Sunflowers (2008) with José Luis Cuerda.

Winners and nominees

1980s
 Best Screenplay

 Best Adapted Screenplay

1990s

2000s

2010s

2020s

References

External links
Official site
IMDb: Goya Awards

Adapted Screenplay
Screenwriting awards for film